South Eastern Regional College (SERC) is a further and higher education college in the south-east of Northern Ireland.

SERC was created following the merger of three institutes of further and higher education in the south-east of Northern Ireland. These were East Down Institute, Lisburn Institute and North Down and Ards Institute. The merger took effect from August 2007. SERC's aim is to become a top 20 global college by 2020 and is currently listed in the top 30 colleges in the UK.

The college was inspected in 2009 by the Education and Training Inspectorate, with the finding that "In the priority skills areas inspected, the quality of education and training provided by the South Eastern Regional College is good".

Campuses
The college's main campuses are situated in:
Ballynahinch 
Bangor
Downpatrick
Lisburn (Institute established 1910)
Newtownards

In addition to these main campuses, smaller campuses are also located in Newcastle, Ballynahinch and Holywood with multiple out-centers throughout the province.

Courses available
The college offers a range of full-time and part-time' courses and has over 30,000 students and over 1,000 members of staff. 
Courses are available in a wide range of subjects at a further education or higher education level. There are also many part-time leisure courses which run in the evening, for example Holiday Spanish, Tai Chi, Painting For Pleasure or Baking Breads.

SERC also runs a range of Apprenticeships and Higher Level Apprenticeships.

Commercial Interests
SERC has a wide range of facilities that are available to rent. The three hair & beauty salons and three restaurants are open to the public to book.

References

Further education colleges in Northern Ireland
Higher education colleges in Northern Ireland
Educational institutions established in 2007
2007 establishments in Northern Ireland